Shcholkine, also commonly known as Shchelkino or Shchyolkino by its Russian name, is a town in the Lenine Raion of Crimea. Geographically, Shcholkine is located near the headland of Kazantyp, on a peninsula jutting northward out into the Sea of Azov from the Crimean mainland. Population: 11,677 (2001);

History

Shcholkine is named after Kirill Shchelkin, a Soviet physicist. Originally the town was constructed in 1978 to house workers of the Crimean Atomic Energy Station (nuclear power plant). The station was inspected following the Chernobyl disaster of 1986, and was found to be located on a geologically volatile site. Construction of the facility was summarily abandoned.

Shcholkine is known for being an increasingly popular tourist destination and dacha site.  Shcholkine's beach has boat and surfboard rental facilities. Nearby Kazantyp is home to several attractions including a local fairground and paintball competitions. The town itself has a central market, many cafes and stores, and entertainment facilities including a movie theater and an internet cafe. The town's main attraction is considered to be its beach, a kilometer-long sandbar sandwiched between cliffs jutting out over the Sea of Azov to the south and Kazantyp to the northwest. Between 1993 and 1999 Kazantyp was the site of the KaZantip music festival, which later (2001-2013) moved to the little village of Popivka near Yevpatoria.

Demographics
The 2001 Ukrainian Census recorded the population of Shcholkine as 11,677 persons. Ethnically the population is predominantly Russian, Ukrainian, and Crimean Tatar. Major religions can be assumed to include atheism or agnosticism, Eastern Orthodox Christianity, and Islam, although there is only one church in Shcholkine's immediate vicinity. Languages spoken are mostly Russian and Crimean Tatar; the use of the Ukrainian language is mainly restricted to tourists from other regions of Ukraine and on schools.

The Crimean census of 2014 recorded the population at 15,450 persons, around 5,000 of which were refugees the Crimean Tatar population mostly fled to mainland Ukraine.

References

External links

 Shcholkine (Russian)
 The Cape Kazantip
 The Kazantip Nature Reserve (English)

1978 establishments in Ukraine
Cities in Crimea
Lenine Raion
Cities of district significance in Ukraine
Populated places established in 1978
Populated places established in the Ukrainian Soviet Socialist Republic